"Nowhere Girl" is a single by English new wave band B-Movie. It was originally released on 2 November 1980, and later re-released in 1982, reaching No. 67 in the UK and No. 20 in Sweden. The song has been described as a tale of alienation. It later appeared re-recorded on the band's first studio album, the Sire Records release Forever Running in 1985. It became a chart-topping single across Europe and received much airplay at the time and was performed on the Spanish TV show Tocata.  The band also re-recorded the song in 2016 for their newest album Climate of Fear released by Cleopatra Records.

Charts

References

1980 songs
1980 singles
1982 singles
British new wave songs
Some Bizzare Records singles
Sire Records singles